Acapulco is an American half-hour adventure series starring Ralph Taeger and James Coburn that aired on NBC in 1961.  It is notable for providing Telly Savalas with his first regularly recurring role in a television series.

Synopsis
Patrick Malone and Gregg Miles are Korean War veterans who, tired of life in the United States, have taken up residence in Acapulco, Mexico, as beachcombers. They also help people in distress and often work for Mr. Carver, protecting him from enemies he made during his career as a criminal lawyer.

Cast
Ralph Taeger as Patrick Malone
James Coburn as Gregg Miles
Telly Savalas as Mr. Carver
Bobby Troup as Himself
Allison Hayes as Chloe
Jason Robards, Sr. as Max

Production
Taeger and Coburn were starring in Klondike, another Ziv Television/NBC series, when it was cancelled after 17 episodes, its last episode airing on February 13, 1961. In order to fulfill Ziv's contract with NBC, they were recast in Acapulco, which premiered two weeks later in the same time slot as Klondike.

The show′s setting in the fashionable resort city of Acapulco allowed its producers to arrange for celebrities such as Julie London, Broderick Crawford, and Gene Barry to make surprise cameo appearances in each episode. The celebrities appeared as themselves enjoying a visit to Acapulco rather than as guest stars playing a character involved in the episode′s plot.

Broadcast history
Acapulco premiered on February 27, 1961, and was broadcast on Mondays at 9:00 p.m. Eastern Time throughout its brief run. It lasted for only eight episodes, and its last episode aired on April 24, 1961.

Episodes
Source:

DVD rights
MGM Home Video owns the DVD rights to Acapulco, but no DVD has been released.

References

External links

Acapulco at TVShowsOnDVD.com

NBC original programming
1961 American television series debuts
1961 American television series endings
Television series by Ziv Television Programs
American adventure television series
English-language television shows
Television shows set in Acapulco